Józef Lewandowski (1923 in Konin – 17 November 2007 in Stockholm) was a Polish-born Swedish historian.

In his youth he fought in World War II. After the war he studied at Warsaw University, with his doctoral thesis completed in 1961. He specialised in East-European history and national issues.

In 1969 he arrived as a political refugee to Sweden and was associated with Uppsala University, where he worked until his retirement in 1988. He has published a large amount of scientific writings, among which several books. Peter Englund, who wrote the foreword to his last book Knutpunkt Stockholm ("Junction Stockholm"), was one of Józef Lewandowski's students in Uppsala.

Józef Lewandowski died on 17 November 2007 in Stockholm.

Selected bibliography
Federalizm. Litwa i Białoruś w polityce obozu belwederskiego..., PWN, Warszawa 1962.
Imperializm słabości. Kształtowanie się koncepcji polityki wschodniej piłsudczyków 1921-1926., PWN, Warszawa 1967.
"Swedish Contribution to the Polish Resistance Movement during World War Two, 1939-1942", Acta Slavica, Uppsala 1976.
”Cztery dni w Atlantydzie” ("Four days in Atlantis"), Ex Libris, Uppsala, 1991.
”Szkło bolesne, obraz dni... : eseje nieprzedawnione”, Ex Libris, Uppsala  1991.
”Węzeł stockholmski : szwedzkie koneksje polskiego podziemia IX 1939-VII 1942”, Skrifter Utgivna av Seminariet i Polens Kultur och Historia vid Uppsala Universitet, Uppsala 1999.  
Knutpunkt Stockholm: den polska motståndsrörelsens svenska förbindelser från september 1939 till juli 1942 ("Junction Stockholm: the Polish resistance movement's Swedish connections from September 1939 to July 1942"), Atlantis, Stockholm 2006.

References

Web sources
The Józef Lewandowski web site (www.jozeflewandowski.se)

1923 births
2007 deaths
People from Konin
People from Poznań Voivodeship (1921–1939)
20th-century Polish historians
Polish male non-fiction writers
20th-century Swedish historians
Academic staff of Uppsala University
Polish emigrants to Sweden
People associated with the magazine "Kultura"